Papatea Bay is one of numerous small bays which lie between the eastern end of the Bay of Plenty and East Cape in the northeast of New Zealand's North Island. A wide, gently curving bay, it lies approximately halfway between East Cape and Ōpōtiki. The small settlement of Raukokore lies on the shore of the bay.

References

Ōpōtiki District
Bays of New Zealand
Landforms of the Bay of Plenty Region